Krzeszyce  is a village in Sulęcin County, Lubusz Voivodeship, in western Poland. It is the seat of the gmina (administrative district) called Gmina Krzeszyce.

The village has a population of 1,400.

Notable residents
 Georg Schentke (1919–1942), Luftwaffe pilot

References

Krzeszyce